Ranot is the northernmost district (amphoe) of Songkhla province, southern Thailand.

Geography
Neighboring districts are (from the south clockwise): Sathing Phra, Krasae Sin of Songkhla Province; Mueang Phatthalung, Khuan Khanun of Phatthalung province; Cha-uat, and Hua Sai of Nakhon Si Thammarat province. To the east is the Gulf of Thailand.

The western part of the district is on the shores of Thale Noi, the northern part of the Songkhla Lake.

Etymology
The name Ranot is a Thai corruption of Renut (Jawi: رينوت), its original name in Malay. However, many local residents maintain that it is a shortened form of the Thai words ราวโตนด (rao tanot: 'a row of palm trees'). The official English-language spelling Ranot is falling out of favor locally, with the more phonetically accurate spelling 'Ranode' being used in its place.

Administration
The district is divided into 12 sub-districts (tambons), which are further subdivided into 73 villages (mubans). There are two sub-district municipalities (thesaban tambons). Ranot covers parts of tambon Ranot, and Bo Tru covers parts of tambons Bo Tru, Ra Wa, and Wat Son. There are a further 12 tambon administrative organizations (TAO).

References

External links
amphoe.com (Thai)

Districts of Songkhla province